Nathaniel Webster, Jr. (born November 29, 1977) is a former American football linebacker who played for the Tampa Bay Buccaneers, Cincinnati Bengals and Denver Broncos of the National Football League (NFL). He was drafted by the Buccaneers in the third round of the 2000 NFL Draft. He played college football at Miami (Fla.).

Webster was a two-time All-Big East selection who recorded 301 tackles, 14 tackles-for-losses and 7 sacks in just 22 starts in college.  Webster entered the 2000 NFL Draft following his junior season at Miami, and was selected by the Tampa Bay Buccaneers in third round with the 90th overall selection.  He was traded in 2004 to Cincinnati. In 2006, he was signed by the Denver Broncos as a free agent.

Legal troubles
While playing for the Miami Hurricanes football team, on October 16, 1999, Webster was arrested in Miami, Florida, for false imprisonment after he allegedly grabbed Natalie Brady (an ex-girlfriend) by the neck, threw her to the ground, and shoved her into a vehicle in which he was riding with a friend. A witness called police, who caught Webster fleeing in the vehicle.  Webster pleaded not guilty to a reduced charge of three counts of battery, which were later dropped after Webster entered and completed a pre-trial diversion program.  However, Brady filed a civil lawsuit, which was settled for an undisclosed amount in November 2001.

On June 10, 2011, Webster was indicted for sexual battery, gross sexual imposition and five counts of unlawful sexual contact with a minor. He is charged with having sex with a 15-year-old girl, the daughter of a former assistant coach for the Cincinnati team, and was arrested on July 21.   According to an indictment unsealed subsequent to his arrest, Webster used guns to intimidate the girl into keeping their relationship quiet.  The girl said he told her if she revealed the relationship, he would kill her and her family, Hamilton County prosecutor Joe Deters said.   Prior to the incident, he was working as a coach at Bellevue High School in Bellevue, Kentucky. A jury trial was conducted in April 2012.  The jury convicted him in April on four counts of unlawful sexual conduct with a minor, and he could have been sentenced to up to 36 years. He was, however, found not guilty of three other charges: gross sexual imposition, sexual battery and a fifth count of unlawful sexual conduct with a minor. On June 6, 2012, he was sentenced to 12 years in prison.  Prosecutors said Webster rejected a proposed plea deal prior to the trial that would have sent him to prison for four years.

References

1977 births
Living people
Miami Hurricanes football players
American football middle linebackers
Tampa Bay Buccaneers players
Cincinnati Bengals players
Denver Broncos players
American people convicted of child sexual abuse
American sportspeople convicted of crimes